The French submarine Clorinde was the lead boat of the class of submarines built for the French Navy during the 1910s.

See also 
List of submarines of France

Notes

Bibliography

 

1913 ships
Ships built in France